Höller is a German surname. Notable people with the surname include:

Carsten Höller (born 1961), German artist
Karl Höller (1907–1987), German composer
Stephan A. Hoeller (born 1931), Hungarian writer, scholar and religious leader
Thomas Höller (born 1976), Austrian footballer
Vanessa Holler (born 1971), American beauty pageant winner
York Höller (born 1944), German composer

See also
Heller (disambiguation)
Holler (disambiguation)

German-language surnames